{{Album ratings
| rev1 = Allmusic
| rev1Score = <ref>{{cite web|url=https://www.allmusic.com/album/love-song-mw0000651538|title=Love Song|work=Allmusic|accessdate=2018-11-05}}</ref>
|rev2 = Christgau's Record Guide|rev2Score = B
}}Love Song'' is the eighth studio album by Canadian country pop artist Anne Murray released in 1974 via Capitol Records. It peaked at number 24 on the Billboard Pop Albums chart and the title track won a Grammy Award for Best Female Country Vocal Performance.

Track listing

Personnel 
 Anne Murray – lead vocals, backing vocals 
 Pat Riccio, Jr. – keyboards
 Peter Cornell – harmonium, harp
 Brian Ahern – guitars, bass, ukulele, percussion, arrangements, horn arrangements 
 Dave Cardwell – guitars 
 Steven Rhymer – guitars 
 Mason Williams – guitars 
 Miles Wilkinson – guitars 
 Bill Langstroth – banjo
 Ben Keith – steel guitar
 Skip Beckwith – bass, percussion, horn arrangements 
 Andy Cree – drums
 Don Thompson – percussion,  saxophones, horn arrangements
 Butch Watanabe – trombone 
 Brent Titcomb – harmonica
 Rick Wilkins – string arrangements and conductor 
 Dianne Brooks – backing vocals 
 Lee Harris – backing vocals 
 Laurel Ward – backing vocals

Production 
 Brian Ahern – producer, engineer 
 Paul White – executive producer 
 Tom Brennand – engineer 
 Chris Skene – engineer 
 The Mastering Lab (Hollywood, California) – mastering location 
 Pacific Eye & Ear – art direction, design 
 Drew Struzan – illustrations
 Paul Cade – portrait photography
 Viktor Von Maderspach – portrait photography
 Harry Mittman – photography

References

1974 albums
Anne Murray albums
Albums produced by Brian Ahern (producer)
Capitol Records albums